Easter Tuesday is the third day of the Octave of Easter and is a holiday in some areas. Easter Tuesday in the Western Christian liturgical calendar is the third day of Eastertide and analogously in the Byzantine Rite is the third day of Bright Week.

Cultural observances

Australia and New Zealand
Easter Tuesday is a normal working day in all Australian states and territories except Tasmania, where it is a legal holiday for certain workers, generally the Public Service and banks. Historically, when the Australian academic year was divided into three terms, Easter Tuesday was an extension of the Easter break within Term 1 in Sydney to allow children to attend the Sydney Royal Easter Show. Under the current four-term system, it is common for Easter Tuesday to fall within the regular school holidays at the end of Term 1.

Easter Tuesday is not a public holiday in New Zealand, but in the public education sector it is a mandatory holiday. Easter Tuesday was a public holiday in Australia and New Zealand in 2000 by happenstance as it coincided with ANZAC Day, and in 2011 as a substitute holiday as Easter Monday and ANZAC Day coincided.

Great Britain
Although Easter Tuesday is not a holiday in Great Britain, a proposal for a five-term academic year with fixed term lengths would see Easter Tuesday become a school holiday as an extension to the Easter weekend (a mini-break within the fourth term).

Northern Ireland  
In Northern Ireland Easter Tuesday is not an official government and public bank holiday.

Republic of Cyprus 
In Cyprus, Easter Tuesday is an official bank holiday.

See also
Bright Week
Easter Monday
Easter Friday
Easter Saturday
Good Friday
Life of Jesus in the New Testament
Sham El Nessim

References

Eastertide
Tuesday observances
Catholic liturgy
Byzantine Rite
Eastern Orthodox liturgical days
April observances
March observances